Freddie Owsley (born 6 January 1997) is an, English-born Scotland 7s rugby union player who last played for Edinburgh Rugby in the United Rugby Championship. Owsley's primary position is wing or fullback.

Rugby Union career

Professional career

He joined Edinburgh Rugby in April 2021, having not made a professional appearance for Bristol, with the intention of playing for Scotland. He made his Edinburgh debut in Round 4 of the 2021–22 EPCR Challenge Cup against , scoring two tries.

In 2022 Owsley was called up to the Scotland Men's 7s squad for the first time ahead of the Toulouse and London legs of the  2021–22 HSBC World Sevens Series.  He competed at the 2022 Rugby World Cup Sevens in Cape Town.

In October 2022 Owsley announced his departure from Edinburgh Rugby “to pursue other playing opportunities”.

External links
itsrugby Profile

References

1997 births
Living people
Bristol Bears players
Edinburgh Rugby players
Rugby union wings
Rugby union fullbacks
Rugby union players from Bristol
English rugby union players
Scottish rugby union players
Scotland international rugby sevens players